Vangueria induta is a species of flowering plant in the family Rubiaceae. It is found in Kenya and northern Tanzania.

References

External links 
 World Checklist of Rubiaceae

Flora of Kenya
Flora of Tanzania
Vulnerable plants
induta
Taxonomy articles created by Polbot